Dirina canariensis is a species of saxicolous (rock-dwelling), crustose lichen in the family Roccellaceae. It is found in the Canary Islands, where it grows on vertical cliffs and acidic rocks. It was formally described as a new species in 2013 by lichenologists Anders Tehler and Damien Ertz. The type specimen was collected by the first author from the Puerto de Mogán (Gran Canaria); the species epithet refers to the type locality. The lichen has a creamy-white to brownish-white thallus (0.1–0.7 mm thick), a chalk-like medulla, and either soralia or apothecia on the thallus surface (but usually not both). Ascospores measure 20–25 by 4–5 μm. The closest relatives of Dirina canariensis are the European species D. ceratoniae, D. massiliensis, and D. fallax.

References

canariensis
Lichen species
Lichens described in 2013
Lichens of Macaronesia